The Ernesto Memorial Chapel, also known as the  (Stone Church) and the  (Methodist Stone Church) is located in Abra Honda, a rural barrio in Camuy, Puerto Rico. After the Kiplinger family lost their 21-year-old son, Ernesto, they donated money for the building of the church.

The unique, stone chapel was designed by architect Albert Munson in a Craftsman style. The church took five years to build and was completed in 1912. The chapel measures about eighty square meters and has a pitched, wooden roof. Its most striking element is that it's made of limestone stones, and built by hand.

Except for around the windows, the mortar used as an adhesive between the stones is practically imperceptible, creating the impression that the stones are supported by their own geometric tie and weight. The building lacks a foundation. The main facade of the building is dominated by an impressive portico on which the belfry is supported. It houses the original bell of 1912. The property was added to the National Register of Historic Places on July 8, 2010.

See also
National Register of Historic Places listings in Camuy, Puerto Rico

References

		
Churches on the National Register of Historic Places in Puerto Rico
Churches completed in 1912
1912 establishments in Puerto Rico
Methodist churches in Puerto Rico
Camuy, Puerto Rico
Stone churches
Chapels in the Caribbean
American Craftsman architecture in Puerto Rico
Chapels in North America